The 2006 World Weightlifting Championships were held in Santo Domingo, Dominican Republic from 30 September to 7 October. The men's 94 kilograms division was staged on 5 and 6 October 2006.

Schedule

Medalists

Records

Results

References
Weightlifting World Championships Seniors Statistics, Page 66 
Results 

2006 World Weightlifting Championships